Arandon is a former commune in the Isère department in the Auvergne-Rhône-Alpes region of southeastern France. On 1 January 2017, it was merged into the new commune Arandon-Passins.

History
During World War II, the town was the site of a French internment camp holding both French and foreign Jews as well as non-French internees.

Population

See also
Communes of the Isère department

References
 Arandon sur le site de l'Institut géographique national
 Arandon sur le site de l'Insee

Former communes of Isère
Dauphiné